Eva McKenzie (November 5, 1889September 15, 1967) born as Eva Belle Heazlit, was an American film actress. She appeared in over 150 films — many of them Westerns — between 1915 and 1944.

McKenzie was married to the actor Robert McKenzie until his death in 1949. The two appeared as husband and wife in The Three Stooges' film The Yoke's on Me.

McKenzie was the mother of the actresses Ida Mae McKenzie, Ella McKenzie and Fay McKenzie.

Selected filmography
 Pioneer Trail (1938)
 Oily to Bed, Oily to Rise (1939)
 The Yoke's on Me (1944)

External links

1889 births
1967 deaths
American film actresses
American silent film actresses
20th-century American actresses